The Bermuda Bar Association is a bar association of lawyers and responsible for the governing and discipline of the Bermuda legal profession.

See also 
 Commonwealth Lawyers Association (CLA)

References

External links

Bar associations
Professional associations based in Bermuda